In psychology, adjustment is that condition of a person who is able to adapt to changes in their physical, occupational, and social environment. In other words, adjustment refers to the behavioural process of balancing conflicting needs, or needs challenged by obstacles in the environment. Humans and animals regularly adjust to their environment. For example, when they are stimulated by their physiological state to seek food, they eat (if possible) to reduce their hunger and thus adjust to the hunger stimulus. Adjustment disorder occurs when there is an inability to make a normal adjustment to some need or stress in the environment.

Successful adjustment is crucial to having a high quality of life. Those who are unable to adjust well are more likely to have clinical anxiety or depression, as well as experience feelings of hopelessness, anhedonia, difficulty concentrating, sleeping problems and reckless behavior.

When evaluating adjustment it can be considered in two ways: adjustment as an achievement and adjustment as a process.

Adjustment as an achievement 

This model addresses adjustment at a specific moment in time, considering an individual's adjustment to one challenge, not to all challenges they have faced. Successfully adjusting to one scenario can be independent of struggling to adjust to another, unrelated scenario. An example of this type of approach is observing a poor student beginning to study during recess because they don't have a home environment where they can effectively study. Beginning to study at another time would be considered adequately adjusting to this scenario, but does not consider the other ways it may impact their life (i.e.: inhibiting social interactions with peers.)

Adjustment as a process 

The 'adjustment as a process' theory portrays that, since the moment we are born, humans are in a constant state of adjustment. Since we exist in a state of constant, oftentimes rapid change, it follows that we cannot break these changes down into separate, unrelated challenges. This method of consideration asserts there is no way to 'adjust successfully', because something will always be about to change and prompt further adjustment. This approach views all life events as inextricable from some form of adjustment.

Successful adjustment 
Successful adjustment is also called being 'well adjusted' and is critical to mental health. Colloquially, being well-adjusted is defined as a person who "is reasonable and has good judgement...their behavior is not difficult or strange." It is important to remember that adjustment is a continuum, not a simple dichotomy; people can fluctuate and be adept at adjusting in different circumstances. In general, a person that is well-adjusted will have the following characteristics: 
 An understanding of personal strengths and weaknesses and a tendency to play up strengths while limiting the appearance of weaknesses
 Personal respect and appreciation, a well-adjusted individual finds themselves to be inherently valuable 
 Appropriate aspirations that require hard work and capitalizing on strengths without being too far out of reach and setting them up for failure 
 Basic needs such as food, water, shelter, and sleep are consistently met, as well as a general feeling of security and positive self-esteem
 Positive attitude and a tendency to find the goodness in other people, objects and activities. A well-adjusted person will acknowledge others' weaknesses but not actively search for faults. 
 Flexibility to respond to and accommodate for changes in the environment
 Ability to handle adverse circumstances: well-adjusted people are able to take negative life events in stride, they will be motivated to take action to remedy the problem rather than passively accept it
 A realistic perception of the world that allows for a healthy amount of distrust of others and encourages pragmatic thinking 
 A feeling of ease within surrounding environments. A well-adjusted person feels comfortable in different aspects of their community such as home, school, work, neighborhood, religious organization, etc. 
 A balanced life philosophy that accounts for and acknowledges the impact that the world has on an individual, as well as the impact an individual can have on the world 
These more detailed characteristics listed above can be synthesized into these main criteria: 
 ability to adequately function
 ability to perform adaptive tasks
 high positive affect and low negative affect
 general satisfaction in various life domains
 absence of debilitating psychological disorders 
An individual that doesn't have these characteristics or is not consistently meeting the listed criteria could be diagnosed with an Adjustment disorder. If diagnosed, they would likely be treated with psychotherapy to help them develop these skills and abilities. Ways to encourage these healthy adjustment mechanisms may include: 
 encouraging talking about and processing emotions
 understanding and offering support, especially during periods of transition
 reassuring them that they are normal and worthy of inclusion
 monitoring progress in different environments (i.e.: home and school) 
 emphasizing decision making, especially starting out with simple, relatively inconsequential decisions (i.e.: what to eat for breakfast, what toy to play with)
 promoting participation in hobbies and activities that are enjoyable and play to their individual strengths

Examples of adjustment methods 
Many methods used for adjustment are also defense mechanisms. Defense mechanisms can be either adaptive or maladaptive depending on the context and the use. In a 2003 study, researchers found that elementary school children that utilized appropriate defense mechanisms had higher performance in academic, social, conduct, and athletic domains.

Day Dreaming 

 Daydreams are brief detachments from reality while awake. Episodes generally include fantasizing about hopes for the future and other pleasant thoughts. 
 Adaptive example: daydreaming about positive social interactions could reduce social anxiety
 In a 2016 study, researchers studied 103 students as they transitioned to university. They found that those who day dreamed more frequently and whose day dreams had higher rates of positive characteristics and positive emotional outcomes were less likely to feel lonely by the end of the study. Participants' day dreams fostered feelings of connection and social inclusion during an anxiety ridden period. Findings from this study suggest that day dreaming can help individuals with socio-emotional adjustment.

Additional Examples 

 Compensation: emphasizing a strength to diminish the appearance of a real or imagined weakness
 Adaptive example: developing strong interpersonal skills to compensate for difficulty with academics
 Intellectualization: focusing on the abstract side of something as opposed to the practical or emotional sides
 Adaptive example: researching a disease after being diagnosed rather than contemplating the life changing impact
 Rationalization: understanding the reasoning behind actions; often touted as "making excuses" but can be adaptive
 Adaptive example: knowing that you need to be stern and harsh to a friend in order to tell them the truth and help them improve 
 Identification: associating oneself with another individual (often a friend or relative) that is extremely accomplished 
 Adaptive example: associating with the success of sibling when you have helped them achieve a goal
 Projection: displacing personal feelings/opinions as those of another person (consciously or unconsciously) 
 Adaptive example: mitigating personal guilt by saying a friend has anger issues rather than acknowledging your internal anger

See also 
 Adjustment disorder
 Psychological adaptation
 Emotional well-being

References 

Behavioral concepts